Sigizmund Dominikovich Krzhizhanovsky (– 28 December 1950) was a Russian and Soviet writer, playwright, philosopher, and historian, who described himself as "known for being unknown". He published only a few stories and essays in his lifetime; the majority of his writings were published posthumously.

Life
Krzhizhanovsky was born in Kyiv (now in Ukraine) to a Polish family on 11 February 1887.

Krzhizhanovsky was active among Moscow's literati in the 1920s, while working for Alexander Tairov's Chamber Theater. Several of Krzhizhanovsky's stories became known through private readings and a few publications. His writing style might have been influenced by Robert Louis Stevenson, G. K. Chesterton, Edgar Allan Poe, Nikolai Gogol, E. T. A. Hoffmann, and H. G. Wells.

In 1929 he penned a screenplay for Yakov Protazanov's acclaimed film The Feast of St Jorgen, yet his name did not appear in the credits. He also wrote the screenplay for the 1935 stop-motion animated feature film The New Gulliver, but, again, was left uncredited. One of his last short stories, "" ("The Smoke-Colored Goblet," 1939), tells the story of a goblet miraculously never running out of wine, which is sometimes interpreted as a wry allusion to the author's fondness for alcohol.

Krzhizhanovsky died in Moscow, but his burial place is not known.

In 1976, scholar Vadim Perelmuter discovered Krzhizhanovsky's archive and in 1989 published one of his short stories. As the five volumes of his collected works followed, Krzhizhanovsky emerged from obscurity as a remarkable Soviet writer, who polished his prose to the verge of poetry. His short parables, written with an abundance of poetic detail and wonderful fertility of invention – though occasionally bordering on the whimsical – are sometimes compared to the ficciones of Jorge Luis Borges. "Quadraturin" (1926), the best known of such phantasmagoric stories, is a Kafkaesque tale in which allegory meets existentialism.

Bibliography

Novellas 
  (1924), Stravaging “Strange”. Included in the collection translated by Joanne Turnbull (Columbia University Press, 2023) 
  (1926), The Letter Killers Club, trans. Joanne Turnbull (New York Review Books, 2011) 
  (1927-1928), The Return of Munchausen, trans. Joanne Turnbull (New York Review Books, 2016) 
  (1929), Material for a Life of Gorgis Katafalaki. In Stravaging “Strange”, trans. Joanne Turnbull (Columbia University Press, 2023) 
  (written 1929; published 1989), Memories of the Future. Included in the collection translated by Joanne Turnbull (New York Review Books, 2009)

Short story collections 
  (1919-1927), Fairy-tales for Wunderkinder
  (1927-1931), Someone Else's Theme
  (1932-1933), What Men Die By
  (1940), Unbitten Elbow
  (1937-1940), One Smaller Than the Other
  (1940), Collected Stories: 1920s-1940s

Plays 
 That Third Guy: A Comedy from the Stalinist 1930s with Essays on Theater, trans. Alisa Ballard Lin (The University of Wisconsin Press, 2018)

Essays and stories published in his lifetime 
  (1919), Jacobi and 'As If'''
  (1925), Postmark: Moscow. In Autobiography of a Corpse, trans. Joanne Turnbull (New York Review Books, 2013) 
  (1931), "The Poetics of Titles", trans. Anne O. Fisher, in Countries That Don't Exist: Selected Nonfiction, edited by Jacob Emery and Alexander Spektor (Columbia University Press, 2022) 

 Translated stories and collections 
 "Quadraturin", trans. Joanne Turnbull, in Russian Short Stories from Pushkin to Buida (Penguin, 2005) 
 7 Stories, trans. Joanne Turnbull (GLAS New Russian Writing, 2006) 
 Memories of the Future, trans. Joanne Turnbull (New York Review Books, 2009) 
 Autobiography of a Corpse, trans. Joanne Turnbull (New York Review Books, 2013) 
 Unwitting Street, trans. Joanne Turnbull (New York Review Books, 2020) 
 Countries That Don't Exist: Selected Nonfiction, edited by Jacob Emery and Alexander Spektor (Columbia University Press, 2022) 
 Stravaging “Strange”, trans. Joanne Turnbull (''Columbia University Press, 2023)

References

External links
 Review of Autobiography of a Corpse
 'Yellow Coal', a short story by Krzhizhanovsky
 Review of recent Krzhizhanovsky translations from The Financial Times
 Review of Seven Stories
 Original texts of Krzhizhanovsky's stories 
 A Man Who Was Gulliver: review of Krzhizhanovsky's complete works 

Russian male short story writers
Russian people of Polish descent
People from the Russian Empire of Polish descent
Soviet people of Polish descent
Soviet short story writers
Soviet novelists
Soviet literary historians
Soviet male writers
20th-century Russian male writers
20th-century Russian short story writers
People from Kievsky Uyezd
Writers from Kyiv
1887 births
1950 deaths